In statistical mechanics, the Fokker–Planck equation is a partial differential equation that describes the time evolution of the probability density function of the velocity of a particle under the influence of drag forces and random forces, as in Brownian motion. The equation can be generalized to other observables as well.

It is named after Adriaan Fokker and Max Planck, who described it in 1914 and 1917.  It is also known as the Kolmogorov forward equation, after Andrey Kolmogorov, who independently discovered it in 1931. When applied to particle position distributions, it is better known as the Smoluchowski equation (after Marian Smoluchowski), and in this context it is equivalent to the convection–diffusion equation. The case with zero diffusion is the continuity equation. The Fokker–Planck equation is obtained from the master equation through Kramers–Moyal expansion.

The first consistent microscopic derivation of the Fokker–Planck equation in the single scheme of classical and quantum mechanics was performed by Nikolay Bogoliubov and Nikolay Krylov.

One dimension
In one spatial dimension x, for an Itô process driven by the standard Wiener process  and described by the stochastic differential equation (SDE)

with drift  and diffusion coefficient , the Fokker–Planck equation for the probability density  of the random variable  is 
In the following, use .

Define the infinitesimal generator  (the following can be found in Ref.):

The limit is taken on

Note now that

which is the Chapman–Kolmogorov theorem.

which is a time derivative. Finally we arrive to

From here, the Kolmogorov backward equation can be deduced.

then we arrive to the Kolmogorov forward equation, or Fokker–Planck equation, which, simplifying the notation , in its differential form reads

Remains the issue of defining explicitly . This can be done taking the expectation from the integral form of the Itô's lemma:

The part that depends on  vanished because of the martingale property.

Then, for a particle subject to an Itô equation, using

it can be easily calculated, using integration by parts, that

which bring us to the Fokker–Planck equation:

While the Fokker–Planck equation is used with problems where the initial distribution is known, if the problem is to know the distribution at previous times, the Feynman–Kac formula can be used, which is a consequence of the Kolmogorov backward equation.

The stochastic process defined above in the Itô sense can be rewritten within the Stratonovich convention as a Stratonovich SDE:

It includes an added noise-induced drift term due to diffusion gradient effects if the noise is state-dependent. This convention is more often used in physical applications. Indeed, it is well known that any solution to the Stratonovich SDE is a solution to the Itô SDE.

The zero-drift equation with constant diffusion can be considered as a model of classical Brownian motion:

This model has discrete spectrum of solutions if the condition of fixed boundaries is added for :

It has been shown that in this case an analytical spectrum of solutions allows deriving a local uncertainty relation for the coordinate-velocity phase volume:

Here  is a minimal value of a corresponding diffusion spectrum , while  and  represent the uncertainty of coordinate–velocity definition.

Higher dimensions
More generally, if

If instead of an Itô SDE, a Stratonovich SDE is considered,

the Fokker–Planck equation will read:

Examples

Wiener process

A standard scalar Wiener process is generated by the stochastic differential equation

Here the drift term is zero and the diffusion coefficient is 1/2. Thus the corresponding Fokker–Planck equation is

which is the simplest form of a diffusion equation.

Ornstein–Uhlenbeck process

The Ornstein–Uhlenbeck process is a process defined as

Other particles in the medium will randomly kick the particle as they collide with it and this effect can be approximated by a white noise term; . Newton's second law is written as

Taking  for simplicity and changing the notation as  leads to the familiar form .

The corresponding Fokker–Planck equation is

The stationary solution is

Plasma physics

The corresponding Boltzmann equation is given by

where the third term includes the particle acceleration due to the Lorentz force and the Fokker–Planck term at the right-hand side represents the effects of particle collisions. Expressions for these quantities are given elsewhere. If collisions are ignored, the Boltzmann equation reduces to the Vlasov equation.

Smoluchowski Diffusion Equation 
The Smoluchowski Diffusion equation is the Fokker–Planck equation restricted to Brownian particles affected by an external force .

The importance of this equation is it allows for both the inclusion of the effect of temperature on the system of particles and a spatially dependent diffusion constant.

At equilibrium the frictional force is much greater than the inertial force, . Therefore, the Langevin equation becomes,

Which generates the following Fokker–Planck equation,

Rearranging the Fokker–Planck equation,

Where .

Next, the total number of particles in any particular volume is given by,

Therefore, the flux of particles can be determined by taking the time derivative of the number of particles in a given volume, plugging in the Fokker–Planck equation, and then applying Gauss's Theorem.

In equilibrium, it is assumed that the flux goes to zero.

This relation is a realization of the fluctuation–dissipation theorem.

Rearranging,

Therefore, the Fokker–Planck equation becomes the Smoluchowski equation,

for an arbitrary force .

Computational considerations
Brownian motion follows the Langevin equation, which can be solved for many different stochastic forcings with results being averaged (canonical ensemble in molecular dynamics).

1-D Linear Potential Example

Theory 
Starting with a linear potential of the form  the corresponding Smoluchowski equation becomes,

Where the diffusion constant, is constant over space and time.

With  the Smoluchowki equation becomes,

Which is the free diffusion equation with solution,

And after transforming back to the original coordinates,

Simulation 
The simulation on the right was completed using a Brownian dynamics simulation. Starting with a Langevin equation for the system,

At equilibrium the frictional force is much greater than the inertial force, . Therefore, the Langevin equation becomes,

For the Brownian dynamic simulation the fluctuation force  is assumed to be Gaussian with the amplitude being dependent of the temperature of the system .  Rewriting the Langevin equation,

where  is the Einstein relation. The integration of this equation was done using the Euler–Maruyama method to numerically approximate the path of this Brownian particle.

Solution
Being a partial differential equation, the Fokker–Planck equation can be solved analytically only in special cases. A formal analogy of the Fokker–Planck equation with the Schrödinger equation allows the use of advanced operator techniques known from quantum mechanics for its solution in a number of cases. Furthermore, in the case of overdamped dynamics when the Fokker–Planck equation contains second partial derivatives with respect to all spatial variables, the equation can be written in the form of a master equation that can easily be solved numerically.
The computation of mean first passage times and splitting probabilities can be reduced to the solution of an ordinary differential equation which is intimately related to the Fokker–Planck equation.

Particular cases with known solution and inversion
In mathematical finance for volatility smile modeling of options via local volatility, one has the problem of deriving a diffusion coefficient  consistent with a probability density obtained from market option quotes. The problem is therefore an inversion of the Fokker–Planck equation: Given the density f(x,t) of the option underlying X deduced from the option market, one aims at finding the local volatility  consistent with f. This is an inverse problem that has been solved in general by Dupire (1994, 1997) with a non-parametric solution. Brigo and Mercurio (2002, 2003) propose a solution in parametric form via a particular local volatility  consistent with a solution of the Fokker–Planck equation given by a mixture model. More information is available also in Fengler (2008), Gatheral (2008), and Musiela and Rutkowski (2008).

Fokker–Planck equation and path integral

Every Fokker–Planck equation is equivalent to a path integral. The path integral formulation is an excellent starting point for the application of field theory methods. This is used, for instance, in critical dynamics.

A derivation of the path integral is possible in a similar way as in quantum mechanics. The derivation for a Fokker–Planck equation with one variable  is as follows. Start by inserting a delta function and then integrating by parts:

Integrate over a time interval ,

Insert the Fourier integral

for the -function,

Iterating  times and performing the limit  gives a path integral with action

Although formally equivalent, different problems may be solved more easily in the Fokker–Planck equation or the path integral formulation. The equilibrium distribution for instance may be obtained more directly from the Fokker–Planck equation.

See also

 Kolmogorov backward equation
 Boltzmann equation
 Vlasov equation
 Master equation
 Mean-field game theory
 Bogoliubov–Born–Green–Kirkwood–Yvon hierarchy of equations
 Ornstein–Uhlenbeck process
 Convection–diffusion equation
 Klein–Kramers equation

Notes and references

Further reading

Stochastic processes
Equations
Parabolic partial differential equations
Max Planck
Stochastic calculus
Mathematical finance
Transport phenomena